Garh Kundar Naresh Maharaja Khet Singh Khangar was the ruler of the Khangar Dynasty. He was born in the royal family of the King of Junagadh in the state of Gujarat (Saurashtra), India in 1140. He was the commander of Prithviraj Chauhan during Mahoba war.

Biography 
Khangar, the son of King Rudradeva, was born on 27 December 1140 in Junagadh, Gujarat, India in the royal family of the Junagadh in Vikram Samvat in Pausha month of Chaitra Shukla Paksha. His father, was the King of Gujarat. He was originally from Banara. He moved to Bundelkhand in 1180 and occupied Junagadh. The 16th century Hindu epic Prithviraj Raso, written by Chand Bardai Rao, indicates that Khangar was in a battle at Jejak Bhakti in 1161 AD during the Mahoba war fought with Prithviraj Chauhan as a commander. The epic describes how the conflict resulted in the killing of Chandela commander's Udal of Mahoba and his brother Alha.

Khet Singh Khangar fought several uncertain wars with the help of Prithviraj Chauhan. After the two achieved victory, Prithviraj Chauhan declared Khet as the king of state who was crowned as ruler in 1181 A.D. Khet named this state as Jijhotikhand (in modern-day Bundelkhand) and established the capital at Garh Kundar. The battle of Tarain was fought between Prithviraj Chauhan and foreign invader Muhammad of Ghor, who invaded Delhi and subsequently Khet declared Jijhotkhand as the independent Hindu Republic.

References

12th-century Indian monarchs
13th-century Indian monarchs
1212 deaths